Miterev is a surname. People with the surname include:

 Anton Miterev (born 1996), Russian football player
 Georgy Miterev (1900–1977), Soviet scientist and politician
 Iurie Miterev (1975–2012), Moldovan football player

Russian-language surnames